Kill Your Darlings is the debut studio album by Irish singer-songwriter David Geraghty (also a member of Bell X1). The album was released in Ireland in September 2007. Following the album's release Geraghty went on a nationwide tour of Ireland. Shortly after its release it received critical acclaim.  David Geraghty was nominated for 3 awards in the Irish music industry these included the Meteor Awards - Best Irish Male 2007, Meteor Awards - Best Irish Album 2007 and Choice Music Prize - Best Irish Album.

Track listing
 "Ragdoll"
 "Back Seat"
 "Kaleidoscope"
 "Long Time Running"
 "Cracked Skull"
 "Fear The Hitcher"
 "It Won't Belong"
 "El Nino"
 "Delgadina"
 "All The King's Horses"

References

External links
Davidgeraghty.com

2007 albums
David Geraghty albums